WWE SmackDown vs. Raw 2008 (sometimes subtitled with featuring ECW) is a professional wrestling video game published by THQ in November 2007, and developed by Yuke's for the PlayStation 2, PlayStation 3, Xbox 360, Wii, and PlayStation Portable video game consoles; with Amaze Entertainment overseeing development for the Nintendo DS version. 

SmackDown vs. Raw 2008 is the ninth overall installment of the video game series based on the professional wrestling promotion World Wrestling Entertainment (WWE), the fourth game in the SmackDown vs. Raw series, the sequel to 2006's SmackDown vs. Raw 2007, and the first WWE game to feature the promotion's ECW brand. 

The game was succeeded by WWE SmackDown vs. Raw 2009 in 2008.

Gameplay
Each wrestler now has two fighting style categories, one primary and one secondary. Each fighting style has its advantages and disadvantages in each particular match type. There are eight styles altogether: high-flyer, hardcore, submission art, powerhouse, showman, brawler, dirty and technical. In addition, creative manager of THQ Cory Ledesma stated early in production that he planned on having numerous wrestler animations redone.

A new "struggle submission system" has been introduced, incorporating more analog control into the game. The player executing the submission can now decide how much pressure is applied by moving the analog stick in a particular direction. Similarly, the player locked in a submission hold will have to power out also by using the analog stick.

The game features the revived ECW brand, and it takes its place alongside the established Raw and SmackDown! brands. The official box art features the ECW logo prominently. The game's ECW branding has expanded the number of weapons available under the ring during gameplay. New weapons such as guitars are available and tables and barbed wire bats can be set on fire. Despite the inclusion of the brand, the  franchise kept its SmackDown! vs. Raw name, although an early logo included "ECW Invasion" in the title. It had been changed, however, to "Featuring ECW".

The game features several arenas that WWE held events at in 2006 and 2007. There are also arenas based on each WWE television show.

Modes

The game allows several different game modes to be played, each with different goals and options. The Season and General Manager Modes of previous games have been merged into the new "WWE 24/7" mode, which takes its name from WWE's video on-demand service. Players can choose to play one of the game's included superstars or create a superstar, or as a general manager of one of the brands. Playing as a wrestler, the goal is to take that wrestler and achieve "legend" status. In order to do so, the player has to win matches, then team with and feud with other wrestlers, and gain popularity. At the same time, they must choose whether to train, exercise, relax, or take part in other activities when not wrestling, all with their own positive and negative effects. (The player could only choose to be either on the Smackdown brand or the Raw brand, as the ECW brand was excluded).

Playing as a general manager is similar to the previous General Manager modes in the series, in which one has to choose a brand and act as its General Manager (Jonathan Coachman for Raw, Theodore Long for SmackDown!, Tommy Dreamer for ECW), draft a roster and make decisions to make it the most popular brand of the three. The General Manager is allowed to make staffing decisions, schedule workouts and events. This was also the last game in the Smackdown vs Raw series to have a General Manager mode until WWE 2K22. There is also an all-new Tournament Mode, which allows the player to control a superstar through the various stages of the WWE tournament, such as Beat The Clock Sprint  and King of the Ring, as well as Money in the Bank tournament. The game also allows you to create your own tournament. (This feature is excluded from the Nintendo DS and mobile versions.) Like previous games in the series, the game also allows players to challenge for and defend championships. The game includes championships used by the WWE in 2007, bringing back the branded championships from the previous game and for the first time, the ECW Championship.

Fighting style system 
The game featured the Fighting Style System which would not appear in later games until the release of WWE 2K18, where the system has returned. With each style, the character would adopt a series of preset abilities. And, depending on primary ability, they would also be able to perform a unique move that can only be activated if the player has a stored finisher icon.

The fighting styles were Powerhouse, Showman, Hardcore, Dirty, Brawler, High-Flyer, Submission and Technical. This system was highly criticized as these pre-setting gave some wrestlers abilities which they cannot actually use, or stopped them from using common moves. For example, Carlito and Chavo Guerrero did not have the ability to perform any of their springboard attacks, and Mr. McMahon was as strong as some of the larger characters in the game. Also, the choice of fighting styles limited the variety of moves available in create-a-moveset.

Wrestlers with the powerhouse fighting style can break out of a pin attempt with just one button press, unless they had sustained a large amount of arm damage. They could also do a powerful Irish Whip (later named a 'Hammer Throw'), which could cause damage if the opponent hit the corner turnbuckles. A player (regardless of weight) could be sent reeling over the top rope with the force of this move. Their special ability was called 'Rampage', a temporary adrenaline rush in which their grapple moves could not be reversed or blocked.

Technical wrestlers automatically reversed all quick grapple moves until they had taken a good deal of arm damage. They also had the ability to perform diving attacks onto opponents outside of the ring. Their special ability was an adrenaline rush that allowed them to counter every attack for a limited time.

Showman is one of the more common kinds. Performing taunts or dives from higher positions cause a faster rise in momentum. They also have 2 special abilities. One allows them to perform one of their opponent's taunts, and if uninterrupted, the opponent is unable to gain any momentum for a limited time. They can alternatively copy their opponent's finishing move if in the correct position to do so. However, the copied move is weaker than the original.

The most common kind is the Brawler. Brawlers can sit on a downed opponent and punch their opponent's head repeatedly. They also have a special combination of 3 to 5 strikes. If the first strike connects, the defending wrestler is not able to block, avoid or counter the remainder of the strikes in the combination. Their special ability is called 'Wreck Shop', a limited adrenaline rush in which all opponent strikes are countered and all strikes become unblockable.

High-flyers can perform springboard diving attacks to opponents inside or outside of the ring. Instead of countering or side-stepping attacks, they perform an evasive roll. Their special ability is a possum pin. After recovering from being knocked down, a high-flyer can remain on the ground. If the attacker attempts a grapple move, the defending wrestler will go for a pin attempt which is difficult to break out of. However, if the opponent attempts a strike, then the pin attempt is lost.

Submission wrestlers can break out of Struggle Submissions with ease. They can also force an opponent to submit to any Struggle Submission, even if it is not a finisher or signature move.

Dirty wrestlers, like Chavo Guerrero, can perform dirty moves, which boost their momentum faster. They can also remove turnbuckle covers and use weapons to build momentum. They can also use the referee as a human shield, making themselves immune to all attacks. When they release the referee, they shove him into the opponent. This is difficult to avoid and momentarily stuns the opponent and the referee. Their special move involves an eye-poke and a low blow which causes a lot of damage to the head and torso.

Hardcore wrestlers get momentum bonuses for using weapons. They can also perform grapple moves while holding a weapon. If they try to use a steel chair with full momentum, they automatically perform the Steel Chair DDT. If they are caused to bleed, they instantly get full momentum. Their special move can only be performed with a steel chair in hand. They strike themselves in the face repeated until they bleed. While this causes full momentum, it also causes critical head damage.

Roster
ECW made its first appearance in the series as a brand. Ashley, CM Punk, Cryme Tyme, Elijah Burke, Kelly Kelly, Kenny Dykstra, Marcus Cor Von, and MVP made their WWE video game debuts. Sabu and The Sandman would make their only appearances in the franchise with this installment. It also marked the return of Jeff Hardy to the franchise who if not counting 2003’s WWE Crush Hour last appeared in 2002's WWE SmackDown! Shut Your Mouth. It is the last WWE video game to feature Torrie Wilson and Bobby Lashley, with the latter returning as DLC in WWE 2K19, after his return to WWE in 2018. It is also the last game to feature Ric Flair as an active member of the roster, as he would be featured as a legend in games moving forward. The handheld versions had exclusive characters, with Eddie Guerrero, Jim Neidhart, and Sgt. Slaughter being PSP exclusives, and Hardcore Holly being a Nintendo DS exclusive.

This is the first game in the series not to feature Chris Benoit after his double murder and suicide in June 2007. All materials related to Benoit were removed or made unavailable through normal means, including all versions of the crossface and diving headbutt.

Jillian Hall,The Boogeyman, and Shelton Benjamin were omitted from the game even though they were a part of the current roster at the time and were featured in WWE SmackDown vs. Raw 2007.

Development

PlayStation 2
Graphics and gameplay are similar to the previous years in the SvR series. It also includes the new 24/7 mode which includes Become a Legend or GM Mode where you can also train superstars and gain them popularity.

Xbox 360 and PlayStation 3
The Xbox 360 has the custom soundtrack feature which people can import their own music in superstars entrances. However, the PS3 has a first person view in entrances where people can control where the superstar looks with the sixaxis controller.

The PS3 version also had a special "Collector's Edition" which came with a DVD detailing the game, a Kelly Kelly trading card, and a booklet featuring various superstars signature moves.

The Xbox 360 version also had special "High Flyer" and "Dirty" Editions which came with Special Edition Slipcase, "I'm a High Flyer" or "I Fight Dirty" T-shirts, 1 page Kelly Kelly calendar, 8 Numbered Limited Edition "Fighting Styles" Postcards, and a "Create a Superstar" Mini Guide.

Wii
Instead of featuring 24/7 mode, it features Main Event Mode, where you can play as a created superstar and rise to the top. The Wii version of the game features only chairs as the exclusive weapons. Also the Wii version only has 5 match types such as Singles Match, Hardcore Match, Tag Team Match, Triple Threat Match and Knockout Match.

PSP
The game has the same graphics as the previous games in the SvR PSP ports, however, Slaughter, Eddie Guerrero and Jim Neidhart are PSP exclusive unlockable Legends.

Matches
This would be the last game to feature the Buried Alive Match, as it would not appear in its sequel SmackDown vs. Raw 2009, or any other games to follow until WWE 2K16 (however only in the 2K Showcase).

Reception

The game was met with average to mixed reception upon release.  GameRankings and Metacritic gave it a score of 73.60% and 71 out of 100 for the PlayStation 2 version; 71.72% and 74 out of 100 for the PlayStation 3 version; 70.47% and 71 out of 100 for the Xbox 360 version; 66.20% and 68 out of 100 for the PSP version; 61.64% and 61 out of 100 for the DS version; 59.14% and 59 out of 100 for the Wii version; and 55% for the Mobile version.

GameZone gave the Mobile version 5.5 out of 10 and said, "Overall it does more than most, has decent visuals, and runs pretty smoothly. But it doesn't have the proper mechanics to make it feel like a wrestling game – consequently, it comes off as an arcade button-masher."  However, IGN gave the same version four out of ten and said, "Smackdown vs. Raw 2008 can only be recommended for the hardcore wrestling fan. For anyone else looking to spice up their action gaming category I recommend Chess. At least every match will be different."

The PlayStation 2 version of WWE SmackDown vs. Raw 2008 received a "Platinum" sales award from the Entertainment and Leisure Software Publishers Association (ELSPA), indicating sales of at least 300,000 copies in the United Kingdom. The game had shipped 6 million units across all platforms by March 31, 2008.

See also

List of licensed wrestling video games
List of fighting games
List of video games in the WWE 2K Games series
WWE 2K

References

External links
 
 
 

2007 video games
Multiplayer online games
Nintendo DS games
Nintendo Wi-Fi Connection games
PlayStation 2 games
PlayStation 3 games
PlayStation Portable games
Sports video games with career mode
Video games developed in Japan
Wii games
WWE Raw video games
WWE SmackDown! 08
WWE video games
Extreme Championship Wrestling video games
Xbox 360 games
THQ games
Yuke's games
Video games with custom soundtrack support
Multiplayer and single-player video games
Mobile games
Professional wrestling games
ECW (WWE brand)
Amaze Entertainment games